Karel Wälzer (b. 28 August 1888 in Plzeň – d. January 1948 in Prague) was a Czechoslovak ice hockey player who competed in the 1920 Summer Olympics, helping the Czechoslovakian national team win the bronze medal. The main goaltender for the team, Wälzer broke his thumb prior to the start of the tournament, was unable to play the first two games, against Canada and the United States, returning for the final match against Sweden. Wälzer helped Czechoslovakia win, giving the team the bronze.

Notes

References

External links

1888 births
1948 deaths
Ice hockey players at the 1920 Summer Olympics
Medalists at the 1920 Summer Olympics
Olympic bronze medalists for Czechoslovakia
Olympic ice hockey players of Czechoslovakia
Sportspeople from Plzeň
Czech ice hockey goaltenders
Czechoslovak ice hockey goaltenders